James Simmons may refer to:

 James Simmons (poet) (1933–2001), Irish poet, literary critic and songwriter
 James Simmons (1741–1807), Canterbury newspaper proprietor, banker, mill owner, mayor and M.P.
 James A. Simmons (scientist), American researcher in bat echolocation
 James Aubrey Simmons (1897–1979), Canadian politician and notary
 James B. Simmons (1825–1905), recording secretary American Baptist Home Mission Society, 1867–1874
 James E. Simmons Jr., American lawyer and judge
 James F. Simmons (1795–1864), United States Senator from Rhode Island
 James S. Simmons (1861–1935), United States Representative from New York
 Jim Simmons (footballer) (1889–1972), English footballer who played for Sheffield United
 James M. Simmons (born 1942), musician and President of Lamar University in Beaumont, Texas
 James Simmons (actor), in films such as Henry V
 Jim Simmons (American football) (1903–1977), American football player

See also

 James Simons (disambiguation)
 James B. Simmons House